Kojo Akoto Boateng was born on Monday 29 December 1986. Starting with the name DJ X-Ray, Kojo served as a radio drive time host on KNUST campus with Focus FM. He then joined the Imperial Broadcasting Company, Kapital Radio where he continued as a Drive Time host and later hosted Daybreak Kapital, the station’s flagship morning show.

Family 
Kojo Akoto Boateng married Adjoa on 29 December 2017 at the Eusbett Hotel in Sunyani. He had known Adjoa for 12 years before their marriage. He has a son.

Work 
Kojo Akoto Boateng was the former head of New Media at Citi FM and Citi TV. He has also led the Research function at Citi FM and Citi TV. He is a panelist/analyst on the Citi Breakfast Show.

He works as a Master of Ceremonies for various high-profile events in Ghana. Among the past events he has hosted include Guinness Africa Hero Awards, MTN Apps Challenge, MTN Business World Executive Breakfast, World Bank 60h Anniversary and Fidelity Bank Corporate Games.  Other events include Miss Tourism Ghana, Ghana Entrepreneurs Awards, Unilever End of Year party CIMG, and Total Ghana Startupper.

At Citi FM, he hosts programs like MOGO, Business Olympics, Family Day Out, Roundtables among others.

References 

1986 births
Living people
Ghanaian radio journalists